Bulvar Rokossovskogo may refer to two stations of the Moscow Metro, Moscow, Russia:
Bulvar Rokossovskogo (Sokolnicheskaya Line)
Bulvar Rokossovskogo (Moscow Central Circle)